Parc Bayas is a sports complex located at Mirebalais, Haiti. It was inaugurated in March 2014. It includes a football field which can accommodate approximately 3,000 spectators.

References

Football venues in Haiti